Isidoro Alonso (born 15 September 1896, date of death unknown) was a Uruguayan rower. He competed in the men's coxed four at the 1936 Summer Olympics.

References

External links

1896 births
Year of death missing
Uruguayan male rowers
Olympic rowers of Uruguay
Rowers at the 1936 Summer Olympics
Sportspeople from Montevideo